Chen Yanyan (12 January 1916 – 7 May 1999), born Chen Jianyan, was a Chinese actress and film producer in the cinema of Republic of China (1912–1949), British Hong Kong and Taiwan.

Life
Chen was born as Chen Jianyan in Ningbo, China in 1916. Chen was obsessed with films as a young girl. When she was 14 she visited the set of "Spring Dream in the Old Capital (故都春梦)" which the Lianhua Film Company was recording in Beijing. She returned each day after attending the Sacred Heart Girls School and struck up a conversation with Cai Chusheng who was to shortly direct his own films. She was given a chance to appear in the film as a screen test by the director Sun Yu. Her appearance was not included in the film as she had been cast as a prostitute and she looked too young for that to be acceptable. However the film was successful she was offered a job but it was only with great difficulty that she persuaded her father. The film company sent around one of their actresses, Lim Cho Cho, who was known for her integrity. Her father was persuaded but he insisted that she never discussed her work at home and that she would not use the family's name.

Chen left for Shanghai with her mother as a chaperone and within three years she was an acknowledged star known as "The Swallow" with a particular appeal to college students. Chen had a very good Mandarin accent which was useful as sound appeared in Chinese movies in the 1930s.

In 1932 she starred in her first film "Nanguo zhi Chun" 南国之春 (Springtime in the South). She also co-starred in the film Three Modern Women which told of three archetypal women competing for the love of the hero. The story was well received and in particular its left-wing approach.

The 1934 film "The Great Road" is thought to have brought her star status when she played Dingxiang (Orchid). Hers is the last face to appear onscreen. This film also made a star of Li Lili and these two together with Ruan Lingyu and Wang Renmei were the female stars of the Lianhua film company.

In 1937 the war began in Shanghai and she soon married Huang Shaofen who was a cinematographer she had known for some years. They had a daughter, Wong Tin-lai (王天丽), but ended in divorce. She stayed in Shanghai and worked for the Xinhua Film Company where she again became a bankable star in their films.

In 1949 she moved and she co-founded her own company Haiyan Film Studio in Hong Kong with her second husband Wang Hao 王豪. The company made two films and the company ended at the same time as the marriage.

Chen produced two films herself, "Love Fiesta", in 1957 and in 1961 "Shark of the Pacific". She won a best supporting actress award in 1961 at the Asian Film Festival for her appearance in the 1961 film "Misfortune". In 1963 she joined the Hong Kong based Shaw Brothers Studio and she gained more award nominations for her acting.

Chen retired from films in 1972, but she still appeared on TV. In 1991 she appeared as herself in "Center Stage" which was a film about the short life of her fellow actress Ruan Lingyu.

Chen died in 1999.

Filmography

Film

TV series

References

1915 births
1999 deaths
Actors from Ningbo
Chinese film actresses
20th-century Hong Kong actresses
Hong Kong film actresses
Hong Kong television actresses
Actresses from Zhejiang
Chinese television actresses
20th-century Chinese actresses
Chinese silent film actresses
Chinese emigrants to British Hong Kong